Deutsche Schule Bratislava (DSB) is a German international school in Bratislava, Slovakia. It serves Kindergarten (kindergarten), Vorschule (preschool) through Gymnasium.

References

External links

  Deutsche Schule Bratislava
  Deutsche Schule Bratislava

Bratislava
International schools in Slovakia
Schools in Bratislava